A Grignard reagent or Grignard compound is a chemical compound with the general formula , where X is a halogen and R is an organic group, normally an alkyl or aryl.  Two typical examples are methylmagnesium chloride  and phenylmagnesium bromide . They are a subclass of the organomagnesium compounds.

Grignard compounds are popular reagents in organic synthesis for creating new carbon-carbon bonds.  For example, when reacted with another halogenated compound  in the presence of a suitable catalyst, they typically yield  and the magnesium halide  as a byproduct; and the latter is insoluble in the solvents normally used.  In this aspect, they are similar to organolithium reagents.

Pure Grignard reagents are extremely reactive solids.  They are normally handled as solutions in solvents such as diethyl ether or tetrahydrofuran; which are relatively stable as long as water is excluded. In such a medium, a Grignard reagent is invariably present as a complex with the magnesium atom connected to the two ether oxygens by coordination bonds.

The discovery of the Grignard reaction in 1900 was awarded with the Nobel Prize in 1912. For more details on the history, see Victor Grignard.

Synthesis

From Mg metal
Traditionally Grignard reagents are prepared by treating an organic halide (normally organobromine) with magnesium metal. Ethers are required to stabilize the organomagnesium compound.  Water and air, which rapidly destroy the reagent by protonolysis or oxidation, are excluded using air-free techniques.  Although the reagents still need to be dry, ultrasound can allow Grignard reagents to form in wet solvents by activating the magnesium such that it consumes the water.

As is common for reactions involving solids and solution, the formation of Grignard reagents is often subject to an induction period. During this stage, the passivating oxide on the magnesium is removed.  After this induction period, the reactions can be highly exothermic. This exothermicity must be considered when a reaction is scaled-up from laboratory to production plant.
Most organohalides will work, but carbon-fluorine bonds are generally unreactive, except with specially activated magnesium (through Rieke metals).

Magnesium 
Typically the reaction to form Grignard reagents involves the use of magnesium ribbon.  All magnesium is coated with a  passivating  layer of magnesium oxide, which inhibits reactions with the organic halide. Many methods have been developed to weaken this passivating layer, thereby exposing highly reactive magnesium to the organic halide.  Mechanical methods include crushing of the Mg pieces in situ, rapid stirring, and sonication.  Iodine, methyl iodide, and 1,2-dibromoethane are common activating agents.  The use of 1,2-dibromoethane is advantageous as its action can be monitored by the observation of bubbles of ethylene.  Furthermore, the side-products are innocuous:
 Mg  +  BrC2H4Br →  C2H4  +  MgBr2
The amount of Mg consumed by these activating agents is usually insignificant. A small amount of mercuric chloride will amalgamate the surface of the metal, enhancing its reactivity.  Addition of preformed Grignard reagent is often used as the initiator.

Specially activated magnesium, such as Rieke magnesium, circumvents this problem. The oxide layer can also be broken up using ultrasound, using a stirring rod to scratch the oxidized layer off, or by adding a few drops of iodine or 1,2-Diiodoethane. Another option is to use sublimed magnesium or magnesium anthracene.

Mechanism
In terms of mechanism, the reaction proceeds through single electron transfer:
 
R−X + Mg → R−X•− + Mg•+
R−X•− → R• + X−
R• + Mg•+ → RMg+
RMg+ + X− → RMgX

Mg transfer reaction (halogen–Mg exchange)
An alternative preparation of Grignard reagents involves transfer of Mg from a preformed Grignard reagent to an organic halide.  Other organomagnesium reagents are used as well. This method offers the advantage that the Mg transfer tolerates many functional groups.  An illustrative reaction involves isopropylmagnesium chloride and aryl bromide or iodides:
i-PrMgCl  +  ArCl  →  i-PrCl  +  ArMgCl

From alkylzinc compounds (reductive transmetalation)
A further method to synthesize Grignard reagents involves reaction of Mg with an organozinc compound.  This method has been used to make adamantane-based Grignard reagents, which are, due to C-C coupling side reactions, difficult to make by the conventional method from the alkyl halide and Mg. The reductive transmetalation achieves: 
AdZnBr + Mg  →  AdMgBr  +  Zn

Testing Grignard reagents 
Because Grignard reagents are so sensitive to moisture and oxygen, many methods have been developed to test the quality of a batch.  Typical tests involve titrations with weighable, anhydrous protic reagents, e.g. menthol in the presence of a color-indicator.  The interaction of the Grignard reagent with phenanthroline or 2,2'-biquinoline causes a color change.

Reactions of Grignard reagents

With carbonyl compounds
Grignard reagents react with a variety of carbonyl derivatives.

The most common application of Grignard reagents is the alkylation of aldehydes and ketones, i.e. the Grignard reaction:

Note that the acetal function (a protected carbonyl) does not react.

Such reactions usually involve an aqueous acidic workup, though this step is rarely shown in reaction schemes.  In cases where the Grignard reagent is adding to an aldehyde or a prochiral ketone, the Felkin-Anh model or Cram's Rule can usually predict which stereoisomer will be formed.  With easily deprotonated 1,3-diketones and related acidic substrates, the Grignard reagent RMgX functions merely as a base, giving the enolate anion and liberating the alkane RH.

Grignard reagents are nucleophiles in nucleophilic aliphatic substitutions for instance with alkyl halides in a key step in industrial Naproxen production:

Reactions as a base
Grignard reagents serve as a base for protic substrates (this scheme does not show workup conditions, which typically includes water).  Grignard reagents are basic and react with alcohols, phenols, etc. to give alkoxides (ROMgBr). The phenoxide derivative is susceptible to formylation by paraformaldehyde to give salicylaldehyde.

Alkylation of metals and metalloids
Like organolithium compounds, Grignard reagents are useful for forming carbon–heteroatom bonds.

Grignard reagents react with many metal-based electrophiles.  For example, they undergo transmetallation with cadmium chloride (CdCl2) to give dialkylcadmium:
2 RMgX + CdCl2 → R2Cd + 2 Mg(X)Cl

Schlenk equilibrium
Most Grignard reactions are conducted in ethereal solvents, especially diethyl ether and THF.
2 RMgX  +  dioxane    R2Mg  +  MgX2(dioxane)2
This reaction exploits the Schlenk equilibrium, driving it toward the right.

Precursors to magnesiates
Grignard reagents react with organolithium compounds to give ate complexes (Bu = butyl):
BuMgBr  + 3BuLi  →  LiMgBu3  +  BuBr

Coupling with organic halides
Grignard reagents do not typically react with organic halides, in contrast with their high reactivity with other main group halides.  In the presence of metal catalysts, however, Grignard reagents participate in C-C coupling reactions. For example, nonylmagnesium bromide reacts with methyl p-chlorobenzoate to give p-nonylbenzoic acid, in the presence of Tris(acetylacetonato)iron(III) (Fe(acac)3), after workup with NaOH to hydrolyze the ester, shown as follows. Without the Fe(acac)3, the Grignard reagent would attack the ester group over the aryl halide.

For the coupling of aryl halides with aryl Grignard reagents, nickel chloride in tetrahydrofuran (THF) is also a good catalyst. Additionally, an effective catalyst for the couplings of alkyl halides is dilithium tetrachlorocuprate (Li2CuCl4), prepared by mixing lithium chloride (LiCl) and copper(II) chloride (CuCl2) in THF. The Kumada-Corriu coupling gives access to [substituted] styrenes.

Oxidation
Treatment of a Grignard reagent with oxygen gives the magnesium organoperoxide. Hydrolysis of this material yields hydroperoxides or alcohol.  These reactions involve radical intermediates.

The simple oxidation of Grignard reagents to give alcohols is of little practical importance as yields are generally poor. In contrast, two-step sequence via a borane (vide supra) that is subsequently oxidized to the alcohol with hydrogen peroxide is of synthetic utility.

The synthetic utility of Grignard oxidations can be increased by a reaction of Grignard reagents with oxygen in presence of an alkene to an ethylene extended alcohol.  This modification requires aryl or vinyl Grignards. Adding just the Grignard and the alkene does not result in a reaction demonstrating that the presence of oxygen is essential. The only drawback is the requirement of at least two equivalents of Grignard although this can partly be circumvented by the use of a dual Grignard system with a cheap reducing Grignard such as n-butylmagnesium bromide.

Elimination
In the Boord olefin synthesis, the addition of magnesium to certain β-haloethers results in an elimination reaction to the alkene. This reaction can limit the utility of Grignard reactions.

Industrial use
An example of the Grignard reaction is a key step in the (non-stereoselective) industrial production of Tamoxifen (currently used for the treatment of estrogen receptor positive breast cancer in women):

See also
Dibutylmagnesium
Hauser base

Gallery

References

Further reading
 
Mary McHale, "Grignard Reaction," Connexions, http://cnx.org/content/m15245/1.2/. 2007.
Grignard knowledge: Alkyl coupling chemistry with inexpensive transition metals by Larry J. Westrum, Fine Chemistry  November/December 2002, pp. 10–13

Specialized literature

Organometallic chemistry
Carbon-carbon bond forming reactions
Carbon-heteroatom bond forming reactions
Reagents for organic chemistry
Magnesium
Chemical tests
Organomagnesium compounds